The Minister of Finance of Kenya is a cabinet position held by the Minister responsible for the Ministry of Finance.

List

Ministers
The following are the Finance Ministers of Kenya since independence.

 Parties

Cabinet Secretaries

See also
Ministry of Foreign Affairs (Kenya)

References

Finance

Lists of political office-holders in Kenya